Bjørn Tore Wirkola (born 4 August 1943) is a Norwegian former ski jumper.

Career
He became World Champion in Oslo in 1966, winning both the large and normal hill competitions. The 1966 FIS Nordic World Ski Championships were also held in conjunction with the Holmenkollen ski festival, making Wirkola the Holmenkollen champion as well (a feat he would repeat the following year). Wirkola won the Four Hills Tournament from 1967 to 1969, and is still the only ski jumper who has won this tournament three years in a row. He also competed at three Winter Olympics: in 1964 he finished eleventh in the Nordic combined, in 1968 Winter Olympics in Grenoble, he achieved his best finish with a fourth place in the individual normal hill, 0.6 points behind the bronze medalist Baldur Preiml of Austria, and the 1972 Winter Olympics, where he finished 37th in the wind-ravaged event in the Okurayama large hill.

On 12 March 1966, on official training, he set his first world record at 145.5 metres (477 ft) and another one on the next day at 146 metres (479 ft), both on Vikersundbakken in Vikersund, Norway.

On 21 March 1969, he set his third world record at 156 metres (512 ft) and the next day his last world record at 160 metres (525 ft), both at the opening of Velikanka bratov Gorišek K153 in Planica, Yugoslavia.

For his achievements as a ski jumper, Wirkola was awarded the Holmenkollen medal in 1968 (shared with King Olav V, Assar Rönnlund, and Gjermund Eggen). The common parlance expression jumping after Wirkola has come to refer to situations where one embarks on a task where one's predecessor has done a particularly good job – or where one is unlikely to succeed.

Besides ski jumping Wirkola played association football for Rosenborg BK in the Norwegian Premier League from 1971 to 1974, and won both league and cup championships in 1971. The same year he was awarded Egebergs Ærespris; recipients of that prize had to be international competitors in one sport and top-level national competitors in a different sport.

Wirkola is of Kven descent.

Ski jumping world records

 Not recognized! Crash at world record distance.

References

External links

 
 Holmenkollen medalists – click Holmenkollmedaljen for downloadable pdf file 
 Holmenkollen winners since 1892 – click Vinnere for downloadable pdf file 
 Olympiske vinterleketer 1924–2006, Åge Dalby, Jan Greve, Per Jorsett, Akilles forlag, 2006, pp. 93–101. 

1943 births
Living people
People from Alta, Norway
Nordic combined skiers at the 1964 Winter Olympics
Ski jumpers at the 1964 Winter Olympics
Ski jumpers at the 1968 Winter Olympics
Ski jumpers at the 1972 Winter Olympics
Holmenkollen medalists
Holmenkollen Ski Festival winners
Norwegian footballers
Association football forwards
Norwegian male Nordic combined skiers
Olympic ski jumpers of Norway
Olympic Nordic combined skiers of Norway
Rosenborg BK players
FIS Nordic World Ski Championships medalists in ski jumping
Eliteserien players
Norwegian people of Kven descent
Sportspeople from Troms og Finnmark
20th-century Norwegian people